List of episodes of the television series In the Heat of the Night, aired 1988–1995:

Series overview

Episodes

Season 1 (1988)

Season 2 (1988–89)

Season 3 (1989–90)

Season 4 (1990–91)

Season 5 (1991–92)

Season 6 (1992–93)

Season 7 (1993–94)

TV films (1994–95)

References

External links
 

In the Heat of the Night
+